The 2003 Asian Rowing Championships were the 10th Asian Rowing Championships and took place from 25 to 28 September 2003, in Guangdong International Boating Center, Guangzhou, China.

Medal summary

Men

Women

Medal table

References

External links
Asian Rowing Fedeation

Rowing Championships
Asian
Asian Rowing Championships
International sports competitions hosted by China